The M3 motorway is a Hungarian motorway connecting Budapest to Nyíregyháza. It will eventually connect Budapest to the Ukrainian border. Two other motorways branch off it, the M30 (connecting the M3 to Miskolc) and the M35 (connecting the M3 to Debrecen). The M3 follows the route of route 3, and, later, route 4. The section of the motorway between Görbeháza and Nyíregyháza was opened to the public in August 2007. The latest section of the motorway, the one between Highway 49 and Vásárosnamény was opened to the public in 2014. The total length of the motorway now is 281 km.

Openings timeline
Budapest – Gödöllő (14 km): 1978.10.16.
Gödöllő – Hatvan (29 km): 1980.10.31.
Hatvan – Gyöngyös-west (15 km): 1983
Gyöngyös-west – Füzesabony (44 km): 1998.09.01.
Füzesabony – Polgár (61 km): 2002
Polgár – Görbeháza; M35 (11 km): 2004.10.
Görbeháza; M35 – Nyíregyháza (41 km): 2007.08.31.
Nyíregyháza bypass (8 km): 2006.08.05.
Nagykálló – Őr (33,8 km): 2013.01.16.
Őr – Vásárosnamény (11,9 km): 2014.10.10.

List of junctions, exits and rest area

Distance from Zero Kilometre Stone (Adam Clark Square) in Budapest in kilometres.

 The route is full length motorway.

 Under construction,  Planned section

Maintenance
The operation and maintenance of the road by Hungarian Public Road Nonprofit Pte Ltd Co. This activity is provided by these highway engineers.
 near Gödöllő, kilometre trench 23
 near Kál, kilometre trench 103
 near Emőd, kilometre trench 151
 near Hajdúnánás, kilometre trench 204
 near Újfehértó, kilometre trench 254

Payment
Hungarian system has 2 main type in terms of salary:

1, time-based fee vignettes (E-matrica); with a validity of either 10 days (3500 HUF), 1 month (4780 HUF) or 1 year (42980 HUF).

2, county vignettes (Megyei matrica); the highway can be used instead of the national sticker with the following county stickers:

{| class="wikitable"
|- 
!Type of vignette !! Available section
|-
|Pest County
| between Szentmihályi Street junction and Hatvan west (11 km – 55 km)
|-
|Heves County
| between Bag and Mezőkövesd (39 km – 128 km)
|-
|Borsod-Abaúj-Zemplén County
| between Füzesabony and Polgár (114 km – 175 km)
|-
|Hajdú-Bihar County
| between Hejőkürt and Nyíregyháza west (164 km – 221 km)
|-
|Szabolcs-Szatmár-Bereg County
| between Hajdúnánás and Vásárosnamény (203 km – 280 km)
|}

Significant artifacts
From Budapest to the Ukrainian border, the M3 motorway features the following bridges, tunnels or covered cuts:

 Bridge
 Tisza Bridge of Polgár over Tisza river
 Landscape history memorial park
 M3 Arcehopark – Open-air museum near this motorway
 Outlet center
 M3 Outlet Center

European Route(s)

See also 

 Roads in Hungary
 Transport in Hungary
 International E-road network

References

External links 

National Toll Payment Services Plc. (in Hungarian, some information also in English)
 Hungarian Public Road Non-Profit Ltd. (Magyar Közút Nonprofit Zrt.)
 National Infrastructure Developer Ltd.

3